Molotov Movement, abbreviated sometimes as Molo, was a Danish hip hop group that started in 2014. It consists of Danish rappers Gilli, Benny Jamz and duo MellemFingaMuzik (made up of Stepz & Branco). They have all previously collaborated in many joint projects and releases. On June 16, 2018, Molo released an EP, M.O.L.O.. Many of their releases have charted on Hitlisten, the Danish Singles Chart.

Discography

EP
2018: ''M.O.L.O.

Singles and Charted Songs
As Molo

as Molo feat. Benny Jamz, Gilli & MellemFingaMuzik

References

Danish hip hop groups